The Great Britain men's national wheelchair basketball team is the men's wheelchair basketball side that represents Great Britain in international competitions.

Great Britain has competed at every men's wheelchair basketball tournament at the Paralympic Games since the first tournament in 1960.

Competitions

Summer Paralympics

European Championship

Past rosters

2010 World Championship: finished 6th among 10 teams
#4 Gaz Choudhry, #5 Simon Brown, #6 Kevin Hayes, #7 Terry Bywater, #8 Simon Munn, #9 Jon Pollock, #10 Abdi Jama, #11 Matt Sealy, #12 Ian Sagar, #13 Daniel Highcock, #14 Jon Hall, #15 Ade Orogbemi, (Coach: Murray Treseder)

2008 Paralympic Games: finished 3rd among 12 teams
Ade Orogbemi, Andrew Blake, Kevin Hayes, Matthew Byrne, Simon Brown, Peter Finbow, Joseph Bestwick, Jonathan Hall, Abdillah Jama, Terence Bywater, Jon Pollock, Simon Munn

2004 Paralympic Games: finished 3rd among 12 teams
Matt Byrne, Andrew Blake, Peter Finbow, Colin Price, Stuart Jellows, Ade Adepitan, Jonathan Pollock, Simon Munn, Terry Bywater, Kevin Hayes, Fred Howley, Sinclair Thomas

See also
Great Britain national basketball team

References

IPC Historical Results Database - General Search, International Paralympic Committee (IPC)
The information from the International Paralympic Committee (IPC) website is based on sources which does not present all information from earlier paralympic games (1960-1984), such as relay and team members. (Per 5 March 2011)
Paralympics - Results, International Wheelchair Basketball Federation (IWBF)

External links
GB Men, at the Great Britain Wheelchair Basketball Association (GBWBA)

National men's wheelchair basketball teams
W
 
Wheelchair basketball in the United Kingdom